Mitchell Seidenfeld (born 18 March 1963) is a former American para table tennis player. His son, Ian Seidenfeld, is a table tennis player.

References

1963 births
Living people
Sportspeople from Minnesota
People from Lakeville, Minnesota
Paralympic table tennis players of the United States
Medalists at the 1992 Summer Paralympics
Medalists at the 1996 Summer Paralympics
Table tennis players at the 1992 Summer Paralympics
Table tennis players at the 1996 Summer Paralympics
Table tennis players at the 2008 Summer Paralympics
Paralympic medalists in table tennis
Paralympic gold medalists for the United States
Paralympic silver medalists for the United States
Paralympic bronze medalists for the United States
Medalists at the 2007 Parapan American Games
American male table tennis players